RyanDan is the debut album by Canadian duo RyanDan, released 27 September 2007 in the United Kingdom by Universal Music. It was produced by Steve Anderson.

When it reached number seven on the UK Albums Chart in the week after its release, it made RyanDan the first identical-twin duo to hit the top ten.

Track listing 

 "Like the Sun" (4:26)
 "The Face" (3:26)
 "High" (4:17)
 "The Prayer" 4:26
 "In Us I Believe" (3:17)
 "Wind Beneath My Wings" (4:15)
 "I'll Be There" (4:38)
 "Bring Him Home" (3:53)
 "Dentro Me" (3:42)
 "Stay with You" (3:34)
 "You Needed Me" (3:49)
 "Tears of an Angel" (3:29)
 "Comme le soleil (Like the Sun)" (4:24)

Charts

References 

RyanDan albums
2007 debut albums
Classical crossover albums